The VI International Chopin Piano Competition was held from 22 February to 13 March 1960 in Warsaw. The competition was won by Maurizio Pollini of Italy, becoming the first winner not from Poland or the Soviet Union.

Awards 

The competition consisted of two elimination stages and a final with twelve pianists. Italian pianist Maurizio Pollini won first prize, with Arthur Rubinstein, honorary chairman of the jury, declaring "that boy can play the piano better than any of us".

Audience favorite Michel Block failed to win a prize and only received an honorable mention. Outraged, Rubinstein created a special prize bearing his name on the spot, and awarded it to Block. 

The following prizes were awarded:

Two special prizes were awarded:

Jury 
The jury consisted of:
  Guido Agosti
  Stefan Askenase
  Nadia Boulanger (vice-chairman)
  
  Sequeira Costa
  Harold Craxton
  Halina Czerny-Stefańska ( IV)
  Zbigniew Drzewiecki (chairman)
  Jan Ekier
  Henri Gagnebin
  
  Emil Hájek
  Arthur Hedley (vice-chairman)
  
  Jan Hoffman
  Mieczysław Horszowski
  Dmitry Kabalevsky (vice-chairman)
  Witold Małcużyński
  
  Florica Musicescu
  Heinrich Neuhaus
  František Rauch
  Reimar Riefling
  Arthur Rubinstein (honorary chairman)
  
  Bruno Seidlhofer
  Pavel Serebryakov
  
   (vice-chairman)
  Magda Tagliaferro
  Ding Shande
  
  Amadeus Webersinke
  Beveridge Webster
  Bolesław Woytowicz (secretary)
  Yakov Zak ( III)
  Jerzy Żurawlew

References

Further reading

External links 
 

 

International Chopin Piano Competition
1960 in music
1960 in Poland
1960s in Warsaw
February 1960 events in Europe
March 1960 events in Europe